Yan Jinxuan (21 May 1924 – 20 November 2014) was a Chinese composer. 

She was best known for composing the music to the opera and ballet, The White Haired Girl.  The opera was first performed in 1945. Yan composed a ballet with music adapted from the opera.  The eight-act ballet premiered in 1965, performed by the Shanghai Dance Academy (now known as the Shanghai Ballet Company).

Yan died in November 2014 at the age of 94.

References

2014 deaths
1924 births
Chinese women classical composers
Chinese opera composers